Ethmia anatiformis is a moth in the family Depressariidae. It was described by Andras Kun in 2001. It is found in Nepal.

References

Moths described in 2001
anatiformis